In the British Royal Navy, a Rear Admiral (D) or Rear Admiral Destroyers is a flag officer in command of the destroyer flotillas of a fleet.

See also 
 Rear admiral

References